Daniel Andrade (born 20 December 1949) is a Senegalese middle-distance runner. He competed in the men's 800 metres at the 1972 Summer Olympics.

References

External links

1949 births
Living people
Athletes (track and field) at the 1972 Summer Olympics
Senegalese male middle-distance runners
Olympic athletes of Senegal
Place of birth missing (living people)